Kiplin is the small hamlet that accompanies Kiplin Hall to form the civil parish of Kiplin in the Hambleton district of North Yorkshire, England. The population of the civil parish as of the 2015 was estimated by North Yorkshire County Council to be 60. As the population was less than 100, details are included in the civil parish of Great Langton. Besides the hamlet of Kiplin, the civil parish includes Kiplin Hall, and is bisected by the B6271 road between Northallerton and Richmond, which cuts across the parish on a north-west to south-east axis.

George Calvert, 1st Baron Baltimore and founder of the US state of Maryland, was born there.

References

Villages in North Yorkshire
Civil parishes in North Yorkshire